Conemaugh Township Area Middle/Senior High School is a public Middle and High School, serving students in grades 7–12 in the Conemaugh Township Area School District. The 13-acre campus is located in the township community of Davidsville, Pennsylvania.

Clubs and activities
CT offers the following clubs and activities  to students:

 Art Club
 Bible Club
 Computer Club
 Conservation Club
 Contownian / Connumach
 Fellowship of Christian Athletes
 Forensics / Speech Teem
 French Club
 Grill Team
 Instrumental Music
 Junior High Scholastic Quiz Team
 Math Counts
 Musical / Drama Club
 National Honor Society
 Principal's Cabinet
 Science Club
 Senior High Scholastic Quiz Team
 Senior Rotarians
 Serving Our Neighbors Club
 Ski Club
 Spanish Club
 Student Council
 Students Against Destructive Decisions  (SADD)
 Vocal Music

Athletics
 Baseball - Class A
 Basketball - Class A/AA
 Football - Class A
 Golf - Class AAAA
 Rifle - Class AAAA
 Soccer - Class A/AA
 Softball - Class AA
 Track and Field - Class AA
 Volleyball - Class A
 Wrestling - Class AA

References

Schools in Somerset County, Pennsylvania
Public high schools in Pennsylvania
1939 establishments in Pennsylvania